Paracobitis hircanica, the Hircan crested loach is a species of stone loach is found in tributaries of the Gorgan River, Iran.

References

hircanica
Fish of Asia
Fish of Iran
Taxa named by Hamed Mousavi-Sabet
Taxa named by Golnaz Sayyadzadeh
Taxa named by Hamid Reza Esmaeili
Taxa named by Soheil Eagderi
Taxa named by Rahman Patimar
Taxa named by Jörg Freyhof
Fish described in 2015